William Faunt (1495/1496 – 1559), of Foston, Leicestershire, was an English politician.

He was a Member (MP) of the Parliament of England for Leicester in October 1553 Leicestershire in 1555. He married Jane Vincent, the daughter of George Vincent of Peckleton.

Ancestry

References

1496 births
1559 deaths
Members of the Parliament of England for Leicestershire
People from Blaby District
English MPs 1553 (Mary I)
English MPs 1555